Aguas Blancas Airport (is an airport serving the Aguas Blancas iodine mine in the Antofagasta Region of Chile.

See also

Transport in Chile
List of airports in Chile

References

External links
OpenStreetMap - Aguas Blancas
OurAirports - Aguas Blancas
FallingRain - Aguas Blancas Airport

Airports in Antofagasta Region